Jameh Shuran-e Olya may refer to:
 Jameh Shuran-e Olya, Kermanshah
 Jameh Shuran-e Olya, Mahidasht, Kermanshah Province